Almond Lee (born 9 Oct 1964) is a horse trainer. His most successful season was 2006/07 with 44 winners, and he sent out 23 winners in 2010/11 for a total of 223 in Hong Kong.

Performance

References
The Hong Kong Jockey Club – Trainer Information
The Hong Kong Jockey Club 

Hong Kong horse trainers
Living people
1964 births